The Iceland gull (Larus glaucoides) is a medium-sized gull that breeds in the Arctic regions of Canada and Greenland, but not in Iceland (as its name suggests), where it is only seen during winter. The genus name is from Latin larus, which appears to have referred to a gull or other large seabird. The specific name glaucoides denotes its resemblance to Larus glaucus, a synonym of Larus hyperboreus, the glaucous gull; -oides is Ancient Greek and means "resembling".

Description
The Iceland gull is a medium-sized gull, although relatively slender and light in weight. It is smaller and thinner-billed than the very large glaucous gull, and is usually smaller than the herring gull. It takes four years to reach maturity.

Call
The call is a "laughing" cry like the herring gull, but higher pitched.

Ecology
It is migratory, wintering from in the North Atlantic as far south as the British Isles and northernmost states of the eastern United States, as well as in the interior of North America as far west as the western Great Lakes. It is much scarcer in Europe than the similar glaucous gull.

This species breeds colonially or singly on coasts and cliffs, making a nest lined with grass, moss, or seaweed on the ground or cliff. Normally, two or three light brown eggs are laid. They breed in Canada and Greenland, but not in Iceland. 

Like most Larus gulls, these are omnivores, eating fish, molluscs, offal, scraps, and eggs. They forage while flying, picking up food at or just below the water's surface, and they also feed while walking or swimming. Their scavenging habits lead them to frequent garbage dumps, sewage outlets, and places where fish are cleaned.

Taxonomy and systematics
The American taxon of Iceland gull by the American Ornithological Society as of 2017 considers the following as subspecies:
 Kumlien's gull, L.  g. kumlieni
 Thayer's gull, L.  g. thayeri

The nominate subspecies, L. g. glaucoides, is very pale in all plumage, with absolutely no melanin in the tips of the primaries in adult plumage. Adults are pale grey above, with a yellowish-green bill. Immatures are very pale grey; the bill is more extensively dark than with glaucous gull, and lacks pink.

References

External links

 
 
 
 
 
 
 

Iceland gull
Birds of the Arctic
Iceland gull
Taxa named by Bernhard Meyer